Katrin Olsen (born 5 January 1978 in Tórshavn, Faroe Islands) is a Danish–Faroese rower, and represents Denmark. She weights , and is therefore in the lightweight class. Before she went to live in Denmark she was rowing in Faroese rowing competitions and became Faroese Rowing Champion two times with the boat Jarnbardur of Róðrarfelagið Knørrur.

2008 Summer Olympics 
In rowing at the 2008 Summer Olympics (lightweight double sculls) in Beijing, Olsen and Juliane Rasmussen seemed for a long time to get the third place after Japan, but ended at second place, and was qualified for the semifinale. However, they also got the fourth place in the semifinal (only the three best qualifies for the final), and lost. Their class was later won by rowers from the Netherlands.

References

External links 
 Knørrur Rowing Club, where it all began, in Faroese

Olympic rowers of Denmark
Danish female rowers
Faroese female rowers
1978 births
People from Tórshavn
Living people
Rowers at the 2008 Summer Olympics
World Rowing Championships medalists for Denmark